Deglur Assembly constituency is one of the 288 Vidhan Sabha (legislative assembly) constituencies of Maharashtra state, western India. This constituency is located in Nanded district. The delimitation of the constituency happened in 2008. It is reserved for Scheduled Castes.

Geographical scope
The constituency comprises Deglur taluka and Biloli taluka.

Members of Legislative Assembly
 1999: Gangaram Thakkarwad, Janata Dal (Secular)
 2004: Bhaskarrao Khatgaonkar, Indian National Congress
 2009: Raosaheb Antapurkar, Indian National Congress
 2014: Subhash Piraji Sabne, Shiv Sena.
 2019: Raosaheb Antapurkar, Indian National Congress
 2021 (By-poll) : Jitesh Antapurkar, Indian National Congress

Election Results

2021 Bypoll

2019

2014

References 

Assembly constituencies of Maharashtra
Politics of Nanded district